The Japanese phrase  may refer to:

"Mamotte Agetai" (Yuna Ito song), a 2010 song by Yuna Ito
"Mamotte Agetai" (Yumi Matsutoya song), a 1981 song by Yumi Matsutoya
Mamotte Agetai, a 1998 manga by Naoki Yamamoto
Mamotte Agetai!, a manga and 2000 film by Ikuko Kujirai
"Mamotte Agetai", a 2013 song by Juju
"Mamotte Agetai", a 2013 song by Yuzu